Rattan Pandoravi as pen name born Rala Ram 7 July 1907 – 4 November 1990, was an Urdu poet and scholar from India.

Biography

Early life
Rattan Pandoravi was born on 7 July 1907 in Pandori, District Kapurthala, India. He obtained his Munshi Fazil منشی فاضل and Adeeb Fazil ادیب فاضل diploma in Arabic and Persian. As an Urdu poet he firstly consulted Dil Shahjahanpuri, the renowned disciple of Amir Meenai, but later Josh Malsiyani became his mentor.

Career
He has written several books of poetry collection, in which he speaks about the eternal sublime beauty that gives the entire universe its form, shape and cognisance, and the limitless universal love that keeps it firmly bound. 
The comprehensive appraisal of his life and works that has been published is Fars - i – nazar:Pandit Ratan Pandorvi ki dilkas nazmiyat.

Bibliography

Bahisht e Nazar
Andaz e Nazar
Rubaiyyat e Ratan
Tahqiqi mabahis (1988)
Hindi ke Musalman Shoara (1982)
Sarmayah balaghat (1983)
Sirre e Maghfarat translation of Bhagvad Gita (1987)

See also
 List of Urdu language poets

References

External links

 Poetry of Ratan Pandoravi on kavita Kosh
Ghazals of Ratan Pandoravi on Rekhta

1907 births
1990 deaths
People from Kapurthala district
Urdu-language poets from India
Hindu poets
Indian male poets
20th-century Indian poets
Poets from Punjab, India
20th-century Indian male writers